Split Sides, Volume 1 is a limited-edition EP released in 2006 by the Benevento/Russo Duo. It was recorded during the "Pause" leg of the fall 2006 tour. Only 500 copies of the EP were printed, so it considered quite rare. Tom Hamilton's American Babies contributed two tracks to the EP, who was the supporting act on the Duo's fall tour.

Track listing
 "Play Pause Stop" - 6:22
 "9x9" - 18:11
 "Memphis" - 13:22
 "Hate Frame" - 9:34
 "Welcome Red" - 7:02

2006 EPs
Benevento/Russo Duo albums